Alexandre Monteiro Dias Fernandes (born 17 April 1967), also known as Xoxô, is a Brazilian rowing coxswain and rowing coach. He competed in the men's coxed four event at the 1992 Summer Olympics.

References

External links
 

1967 births
Living people
Brazilian male rowers
Olympic rowers of Brazil
Rowers at the 1992 Summer Olympics
Rowers from Rio de Janeiro (city)
Coxswains (rowing)
Rowers at the 1991 Pan American Games
Pan American Games bronze medalists for Brazil
Medalists at the 1991 Pan American Games
Pan American Games medalists in rowing
21st-century Brazilian people
20th-century Brazilian people